On 30 November 2019, a landslide in Pokot, Northwest Kenya was triggered by heavy rainfall and killed at least 52 people. The landslide began around 2:30 a.m. on 30 November in West Pokot County near the border with Uganda. Flooded roads and bridges were swept away after the incident, hindering rescue operations. It is one of the worst natural disasters to hit the area in recorded history.

References 

Natural disasters in Kenya